The canton of Saint-Mihiel is an administrative division of the Meuse department, northeastern France. Its borders were modified at the French canton reorganisation which came into effect in March 2015. Its seat is in Saint-Mihiel.

It consists of the following communes:
 
Apremont-la-Forêt
Beney-en-Woëvre
Bislée
Bouconville-sur-Madt
Broussey-Raulecourt
Buxières-sous-les-Côtes
Chaillon
Chauvoncourt
Dompierre-aux-Bois
Han-sur-Meuse
Heudicourt-sous-les-Côtes
Jonville-en-Woëvre
Lachaussée
Lacroix-sur-Meuse
Lahayville
Lamorville
Loupmont
Maizey
Montsec
Nonsard-Lamarche
Les Paroches
Rambucourt
Ranzières
Richecourt
Rouvrois-sur-Meuse
Saint-Maurice-sous-les-Côtes
Saint-Mihiel
Seuzey
Troyon
Valbois
Varnéville
Vaux-lès-Palameix
Vigneulles-lès-Hattonchâtel
Xivray-et-Marvoisin

References

Cantons of Meuse (department)